Pojatno is a census-designated naselje (settlement) in the town of Zaprešić in Zagreb County, Croatia. It has a population of 1,157 people, living mainly by the main street, "Matije Gupca".

Pojatno has good transport connections with Zagreb, Krapina, and Zaprešić.

References 

Populated places in Zagreb County
Zaprešić